Lisa Marie Smith (born December 5, 1968) is an American model and actress.

Early life
Lisa Marie was born in Piscataway, New Jersey, where she was raised by her father and grandparents. She studied ballet for eight years at the New Jersey Ballet and learned classical piano. She moved to New York City at age 15 to study theater, dance and music.

Career
She was a model for Robert Mapplethorpe and was featured in photographer Bruce Weber's ad campaign for designer Calvin Klein's Obsession perfume.

Marie went on to appear briefly in Let's Get Lost, Weber's documentary on the life of jazz trumpeter Chet Baker, and had a small role in Woody Allen's film Alice. In 1989 she appeared on Malcolm McLaren's song "Something's Jumpin' in Your Shirt" from his 1989 album Waltz Darling. From 2000–2002 she hosted the short film series Exposure on the Sci-Fi Channel.

Marie has appeared in magazines including Maxim, Playboy, and Esquire. She has also had her own photographs exhibited and published in magazines; Vanity Fair ran side-by-side photos taken by her and her partner, film director Tim Burton. Marie appeared in several of Burton's films including portraying actress/1950s television horror movie hostess Vampira in the 1994 biopic Ed Wood.

In 2015, Marie starred in the horror film We Are Still Here with Barbara Crampton, Andrew Sensenig, Larry Fessenden, Monte Markham, and Susan Gibney.

Personal life 
Marie met film director Tim Burton at a coffee bar in New York on New Year's Eve in 1992, when she had just quit modeling for Calvin Klein, and Burton had been having difficulty in his four-year marriage. According to a Boston Herald article, they claimed to have bonded over mutually witnessing two UFO sightings in California. She was engaged to him from Valentine's Day 1993 to 2001 and appeared in small roles in most of his productions made during this time.

Burton abruptly ended their relationship following the premiere of 2001's Planet of the Apes, which he directed. Marie had a small role in the film, while Burton's new girlfriend Helena Bonham Carter was one of its lead actresses. Marie responded in 2005 by holding an auction of personal belongings that Burton had left behind, much to his dismay.

Filmography

TV appearances
 Miami Vice, Cinder – in the episode "Baseballs of Death" (1988)
 Showbiz Today, herself – in the episode dated December 12, 1996
 The Howard Stern Radio Show, herself – in the episode dated December 11, 1999
 Exposure, herself as presenter (2000–2001)

References

External links

1968 births
Living people
Actresses from New Jersey
American female models
American film actresses
People from Piscataway, New Jersey
21st-century American actresses
20th-century American actresses